Headmaster is an American half-hour television comedy-drama starring Andy Griffith and broadcast by CBS in the United States during the 1970–71 season.

Griffith returns to TV
Headmaster marked the return to series television of Griffith, whose previous eponymous show had been one of CBS's major hits of the 1960s prior to his voluntary departure and a program which was still in production (as Mayberry R.F.D.), when Headmaster was launched. Griffith had just signed a three-picture deal with Universal Pictures but was so disappointed with the first film in the contract, the rural comedy Angel in My Pocket, that the two parties never made the other two films and he quickly returned to television.

With Headmaster, Griffith fulfilled his desire to be cast in a television series as something other than a rural bumpkin dispensing folksy wisdom; here his character, Andy Thompson, was the headmaster of a prestigious California private school, the Concord School. His wife, Margaret (Claudette Nevins), was an English teacher. Two other cast members from Angel in My Pocket joined Griffith on Headmaster: Parker Fennelly essentially reprised his role as a caretaker, here named Mr. Purdy, and Jerry Van Dyke played the role of athletic coach Jerry Brownell, Thompson's best friend. The show's theme song was performed by Linda Ronstadt.

Reception
Headmaster was given a favorable time slot, Friday at 8:30 p.m. Eastern Time, which had most recently been occupied by the hit sitcom Hogan's Heroes—but the program proved to be, by Griffith's own admission, "a very bad show" and was routinely beaten in the Nielsen ratings by both The Partridge Family on ABC and The Name of the Game on NBC. Production of the show was terminated after just 14 episodes, with the last first-run episode being broadcast January 1, 1971.

CBS (and sponsor Bristol-Myers) had spent some $3.5 million (roughly $25 million in 2022 money) to bring Andy Griffith back to television, and expected a whole season's worth of episodes, so Headmaster was hurriedly replaced by a new situation comedy, The New Andy Griffith Show. The "new" program was practically a carbon copy of Griffith's old one, complete with a North Carolina setting and even guest appearances by Andy Griffith Show regulars Don Knotts, George Lindsey and Paul Hartman in the first episode. However, it met with little more success than Headmaster, and it was cancelled after only ten airings, the last on May 21, 1971. (Also cashiered by CBS were former staples The Beverly Hillbillies, Green Acres and Hee-Haw, as part of the network's infamous "rural purge".) In June, Headmaster returned to the time slot in reruns for the summer, with the last repeat episode being aired on September 10, 1971.

Availability
Viewing this series now is a rarity, despite the big-name lead. It is not on YouTube, has had no DVD release, did not show up in syndication, and seldom is available with private collectors. One episode, "One for the Gipper," is archived in the collection at the Paley Center for Media.

Episode list

References

Brooks, Tim and Marsh, Earle, The Complete Directory to Prime Time Network and Cable TV Shows

External links

 
 The Headmaster at Television Obscurities

CBS original programming
1970 American television series debuts
1971 American television series endings
1970s American comedy-drama television series
1970s American high school television series
Television series about educators
Television series by CBS Studios
Television shows set in California